Chlaenius sericeus is a species of ground beetle.

External links

Carabidae